Walter Bolitho Grose (18 May 1862 – 7 April 1940) was an  Australian politician.

He was born at Creswick to Thomas Bolitho Grose and Charlotte Robins. After attending local private schools he became a printer with the Creswick Advertiser, of which he ultimately became manager and editor. He married Bessie Jane Jeffery, with whom he had ten children. He served as Mayor of Creswick from 1893 to 1894. In 1894 he was elected to the Victorian Legislative Assembly as the member for Creswick, serving until 1904. Grose died in Creswick in 1940.

References

1863 births
1940 deaths
Members of the Victorian Legislative Assembly
Mayors of places in Victoria (Australia)
Australian editors
People from Creswick, Victoria